Mainstream Energy Corporation is a solar energy company founded in 2005.  It is the parent company of REC Solar, AEE Solar, and SnapNRack.

References

Electric power companies of the United States
Solar energy companies
American companies established in 2005
Energy companies established in 2005
Energy in California